"It's in His Kiss" is a song written and composed by Rudy Clark. It was first released as a single in 1963 by Merry Clayton that did not chart. The song was made a hit a year later when recorded by Betty Everett, who hit No. 1 on the Cashbox magazine R&B charts with it in 1964. Recorded by dozens of artists and groups around the world in the decades since, the song became an international hit once again when remade by Cher in 1990.

The song is sung from the point of view of a woman trying to mentor a young girl in identifying true love. She emphatically insists, "it's in his kiss." She becomes frustrated with the girl, who suggests other things such as his behavior and his embrace might instead be the signs she is looking for. The woman scolds the girl for not listening to her, and insists that the one sure sign of true love is seen in a lover's kisses.

Merry Clayton version
The song was rejected by the Shirelles, the premier girl group of the early 1960s, and was first recorded in Los Angeles by Merry Clayton as her first credited single. Clayton had previously provided an uncredited female vocal to the hit "You're the Reason I'm Living" recorded by Bobby Darin as his debut on Capitol Records, and Darin had subsequently arranged for Clayton herself to be signed to Capitol. The composer of "It's in His Kiss", Rudy Clark, was a staff writer for TM Music, which Darin headed. Clayton's recording of the song was produced by Jack Nitzsche and featured Hal Blaine on drums and the Blossoms as chorus. It was released as a single on June 10, 1963, without success.

Clayton performed the song again in the 1987 film Maid to Order in which she, as the character Audrey James, sang the song in the film's climactic scene accompanied by the fictional band Loaded Blanks, played by Jack Russell, Lorne Black, Audie Desbrow, Mark Kendall and Michael Lardie of rock band Great White.

Betty Everett version

Background
Calvin Carter, the chief A&R man for the Chicago-located Vee-Jay Records, found "It's in His Kiss" while visiting New York City in search of material for the Vee-Jay roster which included Betty Everett. After Everett had a hit with another song Carter brought back from New York City, "You're No Good", Carter suggested Everett cut "It's in His Kiss" as the follow-up single. Everett – who found the song puerile – reluctantly agreed. The accompanying vocals on Everett's recording were provided by Vee-Jay session regulars the Opals, a trio of teenage girls (Rose "Tootsie" Addison, Myra Tilliston, and Rose E. Kelley  from East Chicago, Indiana.

Dave Marsh in his book The Heart of Rock and Soul opines that Betty Everett's version, "while [credited] as a solo performance is one of the finest girl group hits, undoubtedly the best one made outside the genre's New York City/Philadelphia/Los Angeles "axis"".

Reception
Everett's version of "The Shoop Shoop Song" reached number 6 on the Billboard Hot 100 chart in the spring of 1964: at the time Billboard was not publishing its R&B chart but her cover was a number 1 R&B hit according to Cash Box. In international release, Everett's "The Shoop Shoop Song" was also a hit in Australia reaching number 21 but was initially overlooked in the UK although Everett's minor 1965 U.S. hit "Getting Mighty Crowded" (number 65) would reach number 29 in the UK. In 1968, the label President Records reissued both songs on one single, with "The Shoop Shoop Song" as the A-side, that peaked at number 34.

Ramona King version
The next recording of "It's in His Kiss" was made in Los Angeles by Ramona King, an R&B singer from San Francisco: this version was produced by Joe Saraceno and former Phil Spector associate Jerry Riopelle and released on Warner Brothers in February 1964, the week prior to the release of Everett's version. Although Everett's single was more likely to receive airplay due to her being an established hitmaker (with "You're No Good"), Vee-Jay feared losing sales to the King version and opted to distinguish Everett's version by issuing it under the title "The Shoop Shoop Song" referring to the song's background vocals.

Linda Lewis version

Background
"The Shoop Shoop Song" first became a major UK hit in 1975 via a disco version entitled "It's in His Kiss" by British vocalist Linda Lewis recorded at Mediasound Studios in New York City with producers Bert de Couteaux and Tony Silvester in a session which also yielded Lewis' recording of her own composition "Rock and Roller Coaster". Lewis would recall: "Clive [Davis]" - Arista Records founder and president - "sent me over to New York [City] to work with Bert DeCoteaux, who’d [produced] Sister Sledge and people like that...And I had all these amazing backing vocalists, like Deniece Williams and Luther Vandross in the studio. I was like, 'Oh, my God!' I’m just this little girl from the East End...I just went in the studio and just hit the nail on the head, apparently." Clive Davis had the idea of Lewis remaking a classic hit song disco-style and had several "oldies" played for Lewis in the studio: (Lewis quote:)"As soon as ['It's in His Kiss'] came on we all said 'That's the one!'" Lewis would state: "I always loved the song and used to sing it in the bath" while opining that making a disco record "isn't really me".

Reception
Issued as "It's in His Kiss" — despite containing a variant of the "shoop shoop" background vocal – Lewis' version became a UK Top Ten hit in August 1975:. on July 26, 1975, the track had been ranked at number 13 in its third charting week, its advance to number 8 on the August 2, 1975 chart being assisted by Lewis' performance of the song on the TOTP episode dated July 24, 1975, with the track reaching its UK chart peak of number 6 on August 9, 1975, with a third and final Top Ten ranking at number 9 on August 16, 1975. "It's in His Kiss" also afforded Lewis an Irish Top Ten hit at number 9, and in the US ranked as high as number 11 in club play with peripheral cross-over to the R&B chart in Billboard at number 96, while the track almost reached the Billboard Hot 100, "bubbling under" at number 107. "It's in His Kiss" was included on Lewis' debut Arista Records album release Not a Little Girl Anymore which reached number 40 in the UK Albums Chart.

Linda Ronstadt performances
On the episode of Saturday Night Live broadcast May 19, 1979, Linda Ronstadt and Phoebe Snow performed "The Shoop Shoop Song" as a duet; in an October 2008 interview Snow stated that she and Ronstadt "always talked about" recording "The Shoop Shoop Song", adding: "Maybe we still will"; although the duet remained unrecorded at the time of Snow's April 26, 2011, death. When Ronstadt participated in two benefit concerts for Jerry Brown on December 21–22, 1979, she performed "The Shoop Shoop Song". That number – featuring vocal accompaniment from Nicolette Larson – was one of six songs performed by Ronstadt which were announced as tracks on her upcoming album Mad Love: however, Mad Love was issued in February 1980 without the inclusion of "The Shoop Shoop Song". Ronstadt performed "The Shoop Shoop Song" as a guest on an episode of The Muppet Show broadcast October 26, 1980. At the Rally For Nuclear Disarmament concert held in Central Park on June 12, 1982, Ronstadt's set included "The Shoop Shoop Song": vocal accompaniment was provided by Nicolette Larson and Rosemary Butler. Had Ronstadt recorded "The Shoop Shoop Song" for her Mad Love album it would have been produced by Peter Asher, who would eventually produce the 1990 international smash hit cover by Cher.

Cher version

Background
Cher's cover was for the soundtrack of her 1990 film Mermaids in which it played under the closing credits, and the single's U.S. release coincided with the November release of the film. It peaked at number thirty-three on the Billboard Hot 100, and number one in the United Kingdom. The song was Cher's first solo number one single; her only previous number one in the United Kingdom had been in 1965 with her then-husband Sonny Bono and their first hit, "I Got You Babe".

Cher's "The Shoop Shoop Song" also topped the charts in Austria, Ireland and Norway; the single achieved a number two peak in Belgium and top ten status in France, Germany, New Zealand, Australia, Switzerland, Netherlands and Sweden.

The success of the single in the United Kingdom and Continental Europe was reflected in its addition to Love Hurts, her subsequent album, as released in those parts of the world, Australia and New Zealand. "The Shoop Shoop Song" was also included in the album's Canadian release but in the U.S. "The Shoop Shoop Song" was not available on a Cher album until the 1999 release of If I Could Turn Back Time: Cher's Greatest Hits.

Critical reception
Larry Flick from Billboard wrote, "Fun and faithful cover of Betty Everett's pop nugget is lifted from the soundtrack to Cher's new film, "Mermaids". Truly irresistible."

Music video
The original video for "The Shoop Shoop Song (It's in His Kiss)" was directed by Marty Callner, and made to promote the movie Mermaids. The video features Cher with Winona Ryder and Christina Ricci, who played her daughters in the film, in a music studio in the clothes and styles of the 1960s period of the film, clips of which are shown throughout. Near the end, the video switches from black-and-white to color and Cher and the girls are shown in jeans and leather jackets spray-painting a wall in an alley. A revised video was issued which deleted the clips of the film from the video. The leather jacket at the end of the video is one of the earliest custom Chrome Hearts jackets ever made.

Track listing
US 7-inch and cassette single
"The Shoop Shoop Song (It's in His Kiss)" – 2:51
"Love on a Rooftop" – 4:22

European 7-inch and cassette single
"The Shoop Shoop Song (It's in His Kiss)" – 2:51
"Baby I'm Yours" – 3:19

European 12-inch and CD single
"The Shoop Shoop Song (It's in His Kiss)" – 2:51
"Baby I'm Yours" – 3:19
"We All Sleep Alone" – 3:53

1993 Spanish 12-inch single
"The Shoop Shoop Song (It's in His Kiss)" – 2:51
"Love and Understanding" – 4:42
"Save Up All Your Tears" – 3:58

1997 US 12-inch single
"The Shoop Shoop Song (It's in His Kiss)" (Obsession Mix) – 8:21
"The Shoop Shoop Song (It's in His Kiss)" (Crush Mix) – 8:19
"The Shoop Shoop Song (It's in His Kiss)" (Ventura Party Dub) – 6:45
"The Shoop Shoop Song (It's in His Kiss)" (Ventura Radio Edit) – 4:03

Charts

Weekly charts

Year-end charts

Decade-end charts

Certifications and sales

Release history

Other versions
"The Shoop Shoop Song" had its first significant UK profile performed by a male act, The Searchers — with Mike Pender on lead – who cut the song as "It's In Her Kiss" for their April 1964 album release It's the Searchers. 
The song – similarly entitled as the one recorded by The Searchers – was subsequently recorded by The Hollies.
Britgirls Helen Shapiro, Lulu and Sandie Shaw all recorded "It's in His Kiss", though none of these versions was released as a single.
The song was covered by Aretha Franklin in her album Runnin' Out of Fools, which was released in November 1964.
In 1974 the song was remade by Australian band The Bootleg Family Band: "The Shoop Shoop Song" was a top 5 hit for the band who later on became known as Avalanche. 
Also in 1974 Lena Zavaroni recorded "It's in His Kiss" for her album If My Friends Could See Me Now.
Kristine Sparkle had a single release of the song uniquely entitled "In His Kiss" (parent album Image).
In 1976 Anne Renée recorded the French language rendering "Embrasse-le" which borrowed the arrangement of the 1975 Linda Lewis disco cover.
Kate Taylor remade "It's in His Kiss" at the suggestion of Livingston Taylor: an acoustic rendition featuring a counter vocal by James Taylor (who co-produced the track with Lew Hahn), the Kate Taylor version was recorded August 1977 at Atlantic Recording Studios (NYC) and became Kate Taylor's sole Billboard Hot 100 hit with a #49 peak on the Hot 100 in Billboard magazine, on whose Easy Listening chart the track reached #13. Despite omitting the signature background vocals of the Betty Everett version, the Kate Taylor cover was fully entitled "It's in His Kiss (The Shoop Shoop Song)": the track was featured on Kate Taylor's 1978 self-titled album release.  Cash Box said that "although it's a soft rocker, her vocal is energetic and the song resonates with new life."
In 1979 Cisse (fi) remade the song as "It's in Her Kiss" for his Summer Party album.
The Swinging Blue Jeans hit No. 3 in the UK with their cover of Betty Everett's previous single to "The Shoop Shoop Song", "You're No Good", but the group's version of "It's in Her Kiss" was unreleased until 1998 when it was included on the At Abbey Road compilation.
Other versions of "The Shoop Shoop Song" have been cut by the Supremes, Aretha Franklin in 1964, and (as "It's in Her Kiss") by The Newbeats on their debut album Bread & Butter also in 1964. 
"The Shoop Shoop Song (It's in His Kiss)" was covered by Nancy Boyd & The Capello's (with Darry Campanilla) on the album Let's Hang On! in 1987.
Kids Incorporated covered "The Shoop Shoop Song (It's in His Kiss)" in 1991 in the Season 7 episode "A Hard Date's Night".
Maja Blagdan recorded a Croatian version of the song, titled "Cura za sve" (Girl For Everything). It was included into her 1994 album Bijele ruže (White Roses).
Living Single "It's in His Kiss" along with several other tunes of the era were sung by Fictional Girl Group "The Flavorettes" in 1997 Season 5 Episode, "Up the Ladder to the Roof".
The Nylons covered the song as "The Shoop Shoop Song (It's In Her Kiss)" for the album Hits Of The 60's A Cappella Style in 1997.
Vonda Shepard did a cover for the album Songs from Ally McBeal in 1997.
Mary Duff recorded it as "It's in His Kiss (The Shoop Shoop Song)" for the compilation album The Ultimate Collection in 2005.
Anna Book recorded a cover for the album Let's Dance in 2006.
Pixie Lott recorded a cover for the episode "Blue For Bluebird" on Inspector George Gently in 2014.
Tiny Toon Adventures used Betty Everett's version in an episode entitled "Toon Tv", where the tiny toons show music videos. Tiny toons pays homage to Cher's cover by featuring a reenactment of a scene from "The Little Mermaid".
Thalía recorded a cover in Spanish for her campaign with Hershey's kisses.
The jukebox musical The Cher Show - which played in Chicago in the summer of 2018 and opened on Broadway in December 2018, features Stephanie J. Block, Micaela Diamond and Teal Wicks as the three aspects of Cher performing "The Shoop Shoop Song": Lauren Katz' review of the Chicago production at PictureThisPost.com mentions that the song is "creatively weaved into the storytelling[, appearing] in Act One in the midst of the early days of [Cher's] romance with Sonny...Cher and her best friends gossip about the possibility of whether or not Sonny is in love with her, and then break into the song. The piece is fun, light-hearted, and full of the hope that young Cher...for her life with this man." Block, Diamond and Wicks recorded the song for the show's Broadway cast album released April 2019.
In Season 7 of The Masked Singer, Kirstie Alley (As Baby Mammoth) sang that song before she got eliminated.

See also
List of European number-one airplay songs of the 1990s

References

Songs about kissing
1963 songs
1964 singles
1968 singles
1975 singles
1990 singles
1991 singles
Aretha Franklin songs
Betty Everett songs
Cher songs
Linda Ronstadt songs
Number-one singles in Austria
Number-one singles in Denmark
Number-one singles in Zimbabwe
European Hot 100 Singles number-one singles
UK Singles Chart number-one singles
Irish Singles Chart number-one singles
Number-one singles in Norway
Music videos directed by Marty Callner
Songs written by Rudy Clark
Song recordings produced by Peter Asher
Helen Shapiro songs
The Newbeats songs
Vee-Jay Records singles
Arista Records singles
Geffen Records singles